Mario Petri (born 8 September 1939 in Trieste) is a retired Italian Olympic rower.

References

1939 births
Living people
Italian male rowers
Rowers at the 1960 Summer Olympics
Olympic rowers of Italy
Sportspeople from Trieste
European Rowing Championships medalists
Mediterranean Games gold medalists for Italy
Mediterranean Games medalists in rowing
Competitors at the 1963 Mediterranean Games